Matthew Benning (born May 25, 1994) is a Canadian professional ice hockey defenceman for the  San Jose Sharks of the National Hockey League (NHL). He previously played for the Edmonton Oilers and the Nashville Predators. He was selected 175th overall in the 2012 NHL Entry Draft by the Boston Bruins.

Playing career
Benning played two seasons of Junior A hockey for the Spruce Grove Saints of the Alberta Junior Hockey League (AJHL), one season with the Dubuque Fighting Saints junior team, then played for the Northeastern University Huskies from 2013 to 2016.

As Benning remained an un-signed draft pick of the Boston Bruins, he opted to sign a two-year, entry-level contract with his hometown club, the Edmonton Oilers on August 27, 2016.

After attending his first Oilers training camp, he unexpectedly made the Oilers opening night roster for the 2016–17 season. After sitting as a healthy scratch, he was reassigned to make his professional debut with AHL affiliate, the Bakersfield Condors. After two games with the Condors, Benning was recalled and made his NHL debut against the Toronto Maple Leafs on November 1, 2016. He scored his first NHL goal against Cory Schneider of the New Jersey Devils on January 7, 2017.

As an impending restricted free agent and due to salary cap considerations, Benning was not tendered a qualifying offer by the Oilers on October 7, 2020, and was released to free agency.

On October 9, 2020, Benning signed a two-year contract with the Nashville Predators worth $1 million per season.

At the conclusion of his contract with the Predators, Benning left as a free agent and was signed to a four-year, $5 million contract with the San Jose Sharks on July 13, 2022.

Personal life
Benning was born in St. Albert, Alberta in 1994. Benning is the son of former NHL defenseman Brian Benning, who was born in Edmonton and played for the same AJHL Saints franchise (then located in St. Albert) 27 years before his son, and also featured with the Oilers through his 10-year, 568 game career. His uncle, Jim Benning, played 10 seasons as an NHL defenseman and is the former general manager of the NHL's Vancouver Canucks.

Career statistics

See also
 List of family relations in the National Hockey League

References

External links

1994 births
Living people
Bakersfield Condors players
Boston Bruins draft picks
Canadian expatriate ice hockey players in the United States
Canadian ice hockey defencemen
Dubuque Fighting Saints players
Edmonton Oilers players
Ice hockey people from Alberta
Nashville Predators players
Northeastern Huskies men's ice hockey players
San Jose Sharks players
Sportspeople from St. Albert, Alberta
Spruce Grove Saints players